Geneva Municipal Airport  is a city-owned public-use airport located two nautical miles (3.7 km) north of the central business district of Geneva, a city in Geneva County, Alabama, United States. According to the FAA's National Plan of Integrated Airport Systems for 2009–2013, it is categorized as a general aviation facility.

Facilities and aircraft 
It has one runway designated 11/29 with an asphalt surface measuring 3,984 by 98 feet (1,214 x 30 m).

For the 12-month period ending June 10, 2009, the airport had 9,069 aircraft operations, an average of 24 per day: 93% general aviation and 67% military. At that time there were 22 aircraft based at this airport, all single-engine.

References

External links 
 Aerial image as of 6 March 1997 from USGS The National Map
 Airfield photos for 33J from Civil Air Patrol

Airports in Alabama
Transportation buildings and structures in Geneva County, Alabama